In set theory, a branch of mathematics, a set  is called transitive if either of the following equivalent conditions hold:

Examples 
Using the definition of ordinal numbers suggested by John von Neumann, ordinal numbers are defined as hereditarily transitive sets: an ordinal number is a transitive set whose members are also transitive (and thus ordinals). The class of all ordinals is a transitive class.

Any of the stages  and  leading to the construction of the von Neumann universe  and Gödel's constructible universe  are transitive sets. The universes  and  themselves are transitive classes.

This is a complete list of all finite transitive sets with up to 20 brackets:

Properties 
A set  is transitive if and only if , where  is the union of all elements of  that are sets, . 

If  is transitive, then  is transitive.

A set  that does not contain urelements is transitive if and only if it is a subset of its own power set,  The power set of a transitive set without urelements is transitive.

Transitive closure 
The transitive closure of a set  is the smallest (with respect to inclusion) transitive set that includes  (i.e. ).

Proof. Then we claim that the set 

is transitive, and whenever  is a transitive set including  then .

Assume . Since , . Thus  is transitive.

Now let  be as above. We prove by induction that  for all , thus proving that : The base case holds since . Now assume . Then . But  is transitive so , hence . This completes the proof.

Transitive models of set theory
Transitive classes are often used for construction of interpretations of set theory in itself, usually called inner models. The reason is that properties defined by bounded formulas are absolute for transitive classes.

A transitive set (or class) that is a model of a formal system of set theory is called a transitive model of the system (provided that the element relation of the model is the restriction of the true element relation to the universe of the model). Transitivity is an important factor in determining the absoluteness of formulas.

In the superstructure approach to non-standard analysis, the non-standard universes satisfy strong transitivity.

See also
End extension
Transitive relation
Supertransitive class

References

 
 
 

Set theory